Palmulacypraea boucheti is a species of sea snail, a cowry, a marine gastropod mollusk in the family Cypraeidae, the cowries.

Description

Distribution
This marine species occurs off the Fiji Islands.

References

Cypraeidae
Gastropods described in 2002